José Carlos Fernandes Vidigal (born 11 July 1969), commonly known as Lito, is an Angolan professional football manager and former player who played as a defender.

He spent his entire playing career in Portugal, mainly with Belenenses in the Primeira Liga. An Angolan international for five years, he played at the 1998 Africa Cup of Nations.

Vidigal managed eight clubs in Portugal's top flight, including Belenenses. He also led his nation at the 2012 Africa Cup of Nations.

Playing career
Born in Luanda, Portuguese Angola, Vidigal spent his entire career in Portugal, representing at the professional level O Elvas CAD, S.C. Campomaiorense, C.F. Os Belenenses and C.D. Santa Clara and retiring in 2004 at the age of 35, totalling 214 matches between the Primeira Liga and the Segunda Liga.

Internationally, Vidigal played with Angola at the 1998 Africa Cup of Nations, earning 17 caps.

Coaching career
Immediately after retiring in 2004, Vidigal took up coaching, starting with lowly A.D. Pontassolense and G.D. Ribeirão. In 2008, he moved to C.F. Estrela da Amadora – coaching his younger brother Luís after he returned from a lengthy spell in Italy – and joined second-tier Portimonense S.C. in February of the following year. 

In late October 2009, as Manuel Fernandes bought out his contract at U.D. Leiria to return to his favourite club Vitória de Setúbal, Vidigal was named his successor. On 8 January 2011, he was appointed coach of the Angolan national side. The Black Antelopes qualified for the 2012 Africa Cup of Nations in October, and were eliminated at the group stage of the final tournament in Gabon and Equatorial Guinea.

With the stated aim of winning titles abroad rather than avoiding relegation in Portugal, Vidigal remained in Africa and signed with Libya's Al-Ittihad Club from December 2012. The following April, he left Tripoli due to political instability.

Dismissed by AEL Limassol of the Cypriot First Division at the start of the campaign, Vidigal returned to Belenenses late into 2013–14, replacing Marco Paulo at the helm of the bottom-placed team and becoming their third coach of the season. Even though he did not finish the following campaign, being replaced by Jorge Simão with nine matches to go, the side eventually qualified to the UEFA Europa League after finishing sixth. 

Vidigal repeated the feat in 2015–16 after leading F.C. Arouca to a best-ever classification of fifth, in only the club's third year in the top flight. Previously, in March 2016, he renewed his contract for two years.

In February 2017, Vidigal left Arouca for Maccabi Tel Aviv F.C. on an 18-month contract with the option of a further year. Despite leading the team to the runners-up position behind Hapoel Be'er Sheva FC, he was relieved of his duties by director Jordi Cruyff at the end of the season.

Vidigal returned to Portugal's top flight in October 2017 when he was hired by C.D. Aves, but after disputes with the board he left the following January. Ahead of the following campaign, he signed a two-year deal at Vitória de Setúbal, and again parted before its conclusion. Days later, he replaced the sacked Jorge Simão at struggling Boavista FC. 

On 17 December 2019, having taken 18 points from 14 league fixtures, Vidigal was dismissed. He returned to Setúbal the following 6 July, three points above the drop zone with four games to play. Having succeeded in that task, he moved on to C.S. Marítimo to replace José Manuel Gomes.

On 4 December 2020, with the Madeiran club in 15th place, Vidigal was replaced by under-23 manager Milton Mendes. He took over from João Henriques at Moreirense F.C. on 29 November of the following year, but left after only one month.

Personal life
Vidigal had 12 brothers and sisters, four of his male siblings being footballers: Beto, Luís (who played for Sporting CP and in the Serie A, represented Portugal and was coached in the 2008–09 campaign by Lito), Toni and Jorge. His nephew, André, was also involved in the sport professionally.

Managerial statistics

References

External links

1969 births
Living people
Footballers from Luanda
Angolan footballers
Association football defenders
Primeira Liga players
Liga Portugal 2 players
Segunda Divisão players
O Elvas C.A.D. players
S.C. Campomaiorense players
C.F. Os Belenenses players
C.D. Santa Clara players
Angola international footballers
1998 African Cup of Nations players
Angolan expatriate footballers
Expatriate footballers in Portugal
Angolan football managers
Primeira Liga managers
Liga Portugal 2 managers
C.F. Estrela da Amadora managers
Portimonense S.C. managers
U.D. Leiria managers
C.F. Os Belenenses managers
C.D. Aves managers
Vitória F.C. managers
Boavista F.C. managers
C.S. Marítimo managers
Moreirense F.C. managers
Al-Ittihad Tripoli managers
Cypriot First Division managers
AEL Limassol managers
Israeli Premier League managers
Maccabi Tel Aviv F.C. managers
Angola national football team managers
2012 Africa Cup of Nations managers
Angolan expatriate football managers
Expatriate football managers in Portugal
Expatriate football managers in Libya
Expatriate football managers in Cyprus
Expatriate football managers in Israel
Angolan expatriate sportspeople in Portugal
Angolan expatriate sportspeople in Libya
Angolan expatriate sportspeople in Cyprus
Angolan expatriate sportspeople in Israel